The 1928–29 Harvard Crimson men's ice hockey season was the 31st season of play for the program.

Season
Before the season began a major change had to be undertaken; the Boston Madison Square Garden, the new indoor facility for the Boston Bruins, was going to serve as the new home for Harvard hockey, but due to a lack of ice, the team would have to travel south to use the New York Madison Square Garden for practices. Tex Rickard controlled both buildings and he was willing to let Harvard have access to either. There was also a change of university policy for the team as it was now able to play more than two away games per season.

The team opened their season with a pair of solid wins and then lost their two-game series against Toronto. Despite the loss, Harvard had pushed the Blues into overtime in both games and looked to be as strong as they were the year before. The second game only ended in a scoreless tie due to Toronto's captain throwing his stick to knock the puck off of a Crimson stick (not a penalty at the time). Harvard's championship hopes were dealt a serious blow when they lost the first game of their collegiate season on Dartmouth's new rink and then had to wait over a month before their next game.

The Crimson were able to exact some revenge in the rematch against the Indians but they had little margin for error after an easy tilt against Pennsylvania. They entered the series against Yale with their foes having gone undefeated to that point (13–0–1) but Harvard could still spoil the Eli's season. In front of 12,000 spectators at the Garden, Harvard ground out a 2–1 overtime win in a penalty-filled game. The rematch came a week later and once again the home team won, unfortunately that team was Yale. Harvard was held scoreless throughout the game but the defense remained stout and only surrendered a single goal in the third period. The final game, which would decide whether or not Yale could claim a championship, was played at Yale on the 13th of March and the two teams proved to be the equal of the other once more. While Yale appeared to be the better team at times during the game they would not distance themselves from the Crimson and the two teams finished regulation tied at 2-all. Overtime was needed but after a scoreless 10-minutes another was required. Neither team was able to end the game by the 80th minute so a third extra session was yet required. With both teams visible exhausted Frank Nelson was finally able to score the deciding goal, he just happened to be wearing an Eli sweater.

While Harvard finished with a less-than-satisfying result and their record was rather poor, the Crimson had played tremendously well through most of the year, they just couldn't get luck to side in their favor in 1929.

Roster

Standings

Schedule and Results

|-
!colspan=12 style=";" | Regular Season

References

Harvard Crimson men's ice hockey seasons
Harvard
Harvard
Harvard
Harvard
Harvard